Saligrama is a sacred stone in Hinduism.

Saligrama or Saligram may also refer to:

Saligram, Nepal, a village development committee
Saligrama, Udupi, a town
Saligrama, Mysore, a town
Salig Ram (1829–1898), spiritual leader of the Radhasoami Faith

See also
Saligramam, Chennai, Tamil Nadu, India